Eric Sekwalor (born 7 June 1964) is a British bobsledder. He competed in the two man event at the 1998 Winter Olympics.
He was employed by Surrey Police as an officer for a short time in 2018

References

External links
 

1964 births
Living people
British male bobsledders
Olympic bobsledders of Great Britain
Bobsledders at the 1998 Winter Olympics
Sportspeople from Accra
Ghanaian emigrants to the United Kingdom